Mouffak Kanaan is a Syrian football forward who played for Syria in the 1984 Asian Cup.

References
Stats

Living people
Syrian footballers
1984 AFC Asian Cup players
Association football forwards
Year of birth missing (living people)